Gunnar Huseland Grantz (27 January 1885 – 8 February 1941) was a Norwegian rower who competed for Christiania Roklub. He competed in coxed eight and in coxed four, inriggers at the 1912 Summer Olympics in Stockholm. He died in the United States.

References

External links
 
 

1885 births
1941 deaths
Rowers from Oslo
Norwegian male rowers
Rowers at the 1912 Summer Olympics
Olympic rowers of Norway